These are the intermediate colleges in the Asian country of Pakistan.

Public sector 
These are the intermediate colleges in Pakistan.

Medical colleges
Khyber Medical College, Peshawar
King Edward Medical College
Govt. Sadiq Egerton College Bahawalpur
Allama Iqbal Medical College 
Ameer-ud-Din Medical College
Army Medical College
Azad Jammu and Kashmir Medical College
Bacha Khan Medical College, Mardan
Bannu Medical College
Bolan Medical College, Quetta
Central Park Medical College
Chandka Medical College
D.G.Khan Medical College
Dow International Medical College
Malik Arslan Aslam college
Fatima Jinnah Medical College
Federal Medical and Dental College
Gajju Khan Medical College Swabi, Swabi District
Ghulam Muhammad Mahar Medical College
Gomal Medical College
Gujranwala Medical College
Khawaja Muhammad Safdar Medical College
Khyber Girls Medical College
Nawaz Sharif Medical College
Nishtar Medical College
Punjab Medical College
Quaid-e-Azam Medical College
Rawalpindi Medical College
Sahiwal Medical College
Saidu Medical College, Swat District
Sargodha Medical College
Government College of Technology Rasul M.B.Din
Sindh Medical College

Colleges for boys 
Army Public Schools & Colleges System
The Reader Group of Colleges, Sargodha
Cadet College Rawalpindi
Army Burhall School and College for Boys KPK, Abbotabad
Govt. Degree College Phool Nagar, Kasur (Boys)
Government Post Graduate College, Chakwal
Adamjee Government Science College, Karachi
Kallar Kahar Science College
Britain International College, Multan
Cadet College Kallar Kahar, Punjab
Cadet College Hasan Abdal, Hasan Abdal, Punjab
Cadet College Jhelum, Jhelum, Punjab
Pakistan Scouts Cadet College Batrasi, Mansehra
Chenab College Ahmedpur Sial Ahmedpur Sial Tehsil
Chenab College Chiniot Chiniot District
Chenab College Jhang, Jhang District
Chenab College Shorkot, Shorkot Tehsil
City College of Science and Commerce Multan
Concordia Colleges, Punjab
D. J. Sindh Government Science College, Karachi
Defence Authority Degree College for Men, Karachi
Faran Model College Jhang, Jhang District
Fazal Haq College for Boys, Mardan
Ghazali Inter College, Bhawana
Government College for Men Nazimabad, Karachi
Government College of Science Wahdat Road, Lahore
Government College of Science, Multan
Government College University (GCU), Lahore
Government Islamia College Civil Lines, Lahore 
Government National College, Karachi
Islamia College Lahore, Punjab Pakistan
Government Islamia Science College, Karachi
Karnal Captain Sher Khan (Nishan Haider) Cadet College Ismaila, Swabi, KPK
Edwardes College Peshawar, Peshawar
Kohat Cadet College Kohat, Kohat KPK
Paf College Risalpur, Nowshera, KPK
Pak National College of Commerce and Sciences, Rawalpindi
Pakistan Shipowners' College, Karachi
Punjab Group of Colleges
Royal Education & Law College Arifwala
Dr Ziauddin Intermediate College, Karachi
Government Post Graduate College Pattoki
[[New Horizons Academy for Matric and Intermediate, Madina Syedan Gujrat

Colleges for girls 
 Army Public Schools & Colleges System 
Punjab Group of Colleges

 The Reader Group of Colleges, Punjab
 Defence College for Girls, KP Mardan Cantt.
 Chenab College Ahmedpur Sial, Ahmedpur Sial Tehsil
 Chenab College Chiniot, Chiniot District
 Concordia Colleges, Punjab
 Chenab College Jhang, Jhang District
 Chenab College Shorkot, Shorkot Tehsil
 Faran Model College Jhang, Jhang District
Govt. Degree College Phool Nagar, Kasur (Girls)
 Rana Liaquat Ali Khan Government College of Home Economics, Karachi
 Sir Syed Government Girls College
 Ghazali Inter College, Bhawana
 Government College for Girls, Peshawar Road, Rawalpindi
 Royal Education & Law College Arifwala
 Hira Girls College Bhoun Road Chakwal
 Peshawar College for Girls, Peshawar
 Federal College Risalpur, Khyber Pakhtunkhwa
 Gulberg Degree College Lahore, Lahore
Frontier Degree College Peshawar, Peshawar
[[New Horizons Academy for Matric and Intermediate Madina Syedan Gujrat

Other colleges 
 Concordia Colleges (Head Office Lahore)
 Greenfield College Sargodha, Sargodha
 Cadet College Rawalpindi, Chakri Pakistan
 Aga Khan Higher Secondary School, Karachi
 AIMS Science College
 Aligarh Institute of Technology, Karachi
 Bahria College, Karachi
 Ghulam Muhammad Mahar Medical College Sukkur
 Multan Institute of Professional Studies
 National College of Computer Sciences (Gujranwala)
 Professional College of Commerce and Management Sciences (Rajanpur)
 Republic College, Islamabad
Nowshera College of Nursing and Health Sciences, Akora Khattak, KP

Cadet colleges 

 Military College Jhelum, Punjab, Pakistan
 Cadet College Hasan Abdal, Hassan Abdal
 Cadet College Lahore, Punjab, Pakistan.
 Cadet College Fateh Jang, Fateh Jang
 Cadet College Larkana, Larkana District
 Cadet College Kallar Kahar, Kallar Kahar
 Garrison Cadet College Kohat, Kohat District
 Cadet College Attock, Attock
 Pakistan Steel Cadet College, Karachi
 PAF College Sargodha, Sargodha
 PAF Public School Lower Topa, Murree
 Cadet College Chakwal
 Karnal Sher Khan Cadet College Swabi
 WAPDA Cadet College Tarbela Tarbela
 Cadet College Razmak
 Pakistan Air Force Academy, Risalpur, Nowshera District
 Cadet College Choa Saiden Shah, Chakwal
 Cadet College Chakwal for Girls, Chakwal
 Cadet College Rawalpindi, Rawalpindi
 cadet collage kohat

Military colleges 
Military College of Engineering, Risalpur
 Army Public College of Management Sciences
 Military College Jhelum, Jhelum District
 Military College Murree, Rawalpindi District
 Military College Sui, Dera Bugti District

Gallery

See also

 List of universities in Pakistan
 Education in Pakistan
 List of law schools in Pakistan
 Government College of Women
 Government Degree Girls College

Colleges